Sarah Honig is an Israeli journalist and opinion columnist.

Early life
Honig was born in Israel and reared in both Israel and the United States. She was educated at the High School of Music and Art in New York City and at Tel Aviv University.

Career
Honig began work as a reporter for the Jerusalem Post in 1968, while still a university student.

In the 1960s, 70s and 80s, Honig was the leading reporter covering the Movement to Free Soviet Jewry and the Refuseniks.

In the early 1980s she became the Post's senior political correspondent. She had a column on Israeli politics, Insider Dealings. From 1991–2001 she was the Post's political analyst. Since 1999 she has had a column, Another Tack, covering Israel and world affairs. Since 2003 she has also been a senior editorial writer.

Publications
Debunking the Bull: For Seekers of Another Tack (Gefen, 2013)

Personal life
Honig is a mother, and an artist. She collects antique and vintage dolls.

References

External links
 

The Jerusalem Post people
Israeli women journalists
Living people
Israeli journalists
Year of birth missing (living people)
The High School of Music & Art alumni
Tel Aviv University alumni